Branquinha is a municipality located in the Brazilian state of Alagoas. Its population is 10,460 (2020) and its area is 191 km². It was devastated by flooding in June 2010.

References

Municipalities in Alagoas